James Edward Halligan (February 11, 1879 – January 30, 1965) was an American football coach and college athletic administrator.  He served as the head football coach at Massachusetts Agricultural College—now the University of Massachusetts Amherst—from 1901 to 1903 and at Delaware Valley College for 1904 and 1905, compiling a career college football record of 20–10–3 overall.  Halligan was the athletic director at Louisiana State University (LSU) from 1910 to 1913.  He also worked as a chemist and fertilizer expert.  He died on January 30, 1965.

Head coaching record

References

1879 births
1965 deaths
20th-century American chemists
Delaware Valley Aggies football coaches
LSU Tigers and Lady Tigers athletic directors
UMass Minutemen football coaches
Sportspeople from Boston